Feature Presentation is the second studio album by Kansas City rapper Kutt Calhoun. It was released on October 7, 2008 and was able to chart #60 on Billboard'''s "Top R&B/Hip-Hop Albums" chart in its first week of release.

It contains 19 tracks, with collaborations with fellow Strange Music label mates like Tech N9ne, the group Skatterman & Snug Brim, and Krizz Kaliko. It also includes other artists such as BG-Bulletwound, The Popper, Greed, Joe Vertigo, Riv Locc, DJ Chill, Vance Leroy, Bishop, and singer Jerita Streater. The album has production from Michael "Seven" Summers, Wyshmaster, Matic Lee and Young Fyre. Rap Reviews'' gave the album a positive review and a score of 8/10.

A music video was shot for the song "Bunk Rock Bitch," and the video was released by the record label through their YouTube account on January 15, 2009. The video features fellow label mates Tech N9ne and Krizz Kaliko.

Track list

See also
Kutt Calhoun discography

References

Kutt Calhoun albums
2008 albums
Albums produced by Seven (record producer)
Strange Music albums